A desk is a piece of furniture with a flat work surface.

Desk or DESK may also refer to:

Places in Iran
 Dask, Hormozgan
 Desk, Anbarabad, Kerman Province
 Desk, Bam, Kerman Province
 Desk-e Bala, Kerman Province

Other uses
 In newspaper production, a department covering a particular topic
 A pair of players within the string section of an orchestra
 VV DESK, a Netherlands football club
 Deutsche Schule Kobe/European School, a German school in Japan